Brenda Lee Strong (born March 25, 1960) is an American actress. She began her career in television, including guest starring appearances in Twin Peaks, Party of Five, Seinfeld, Scandal, Star Trek: The Next Generation, Blossom and Sports Night. She was a regular cast member in the sitcoms Desperate Housewives (2004–2012), Scorch (1992), and The Help (2004).

Strong had supporting roles in a number of films, including Starship Troopers (1997), Black Dog (1998), The Deep End of the Ocean (1999), Starship Troopers 2: Hero of the Federation (2004) and The Work and the Glory (2004). She is best known for her role as Mary Alice Young in the ABC television comedy-drama series Desperate Housewives (2004–2012), for which she was nominated for two Emmy Awards. Strong later starred as Ann Ewing in the TNT prime time soap opera Dallas (2012–14).

In 2016, she guest starred as Queen Nia in The 100, and undertook a recurring role as Lillian Luthor on Supergirl. Strong appeared as a recurring character in the second season of the Netflix Original 13 Reasons Why. In September 2018, Strong was promoted to series regular for its third season. She directed two episodes in season four.

Early life
Strong was born in Portland, Oregon, the daughter of Jean (née Weatherford) and Jack Strong and grew up in Brightwood, graduating in 1978 from Sandy Union High School in Sandy, Oregon. She later moved to Arizona to attend college and graduated from Arizona State University with a Bachelor of Music in musical theater. Strong was crowned Miss Arizona in 1980.

Career

Early works
Her first break after college was a spot in Billy Crystal's 1984 music video "You Look Marvelous". Her first television appearances came in 1985 with brief stints on St. Elsewhere, MacGyver, and Cheers. She also made guest appearances on Hotel, Star Trek: The Next Generation, Matlock, Murphy Brown, Herman's Head, and Blossom. In 1990, she had a recurring role in the ABC series Twin Peaks. She made her film debut in 1986 comedy film Weekend Warriors before having a supporting part in Spaceballs (1987).

In 1992, Strong starred in the short-lived CBS sitcom Scorch. She spent the following decade playing recurring and guest starring roles in many dramatic and comedic shows. From 1996 to 1998, she appeared as Elaine's nemesis Sue Ellen Mischke, the "bra-less wonder" and "Oh Henry!" candy bar heiress, on several episodes of NBC sitcom Seinfeld. She also had recurring roles on Party of Five, 7th Heaven and Everwood and guest starred on 3rd Rock from the Sun, ER, Picket Fences, Silk Stalkings, Dawson's Creek, Any Day Now, Ally McBeal, CSI: Crime Scene Investigation and Nip/Tuck. 

From 1998 to 2000, she played Sally Sasser, the nemesis of Felicity Huffman's Dana Whitaker, in the ABC comedy-drama Sports Night. In early 2004, she starred as wealthy Arlene Ridgeway in The WB short-lived sitcom, The Help.

Strong had roles in a number of films, including My Life, Malice, and The Craft before being cast as Captain Deladier in the 1997 science fiction action film Starship Troopers. Her character died in the original film, but she returned in a different role as Sergeant Dede Rake in the second film, Starship Troopers 2: Hero of the Federation. In 1998, she starred opposite Patrick Swayze in the action film Black Dog, playing his wife. The following year, she played Michelle Pfeiffer's character's best friend in the drama film The Deep End of the Ocean. In 2000, she appeared in the horror anthology Terror Tract and, in 2002, had a short part in Red Dragon.

2004–2012: Desperate Housewives
Strong starred, mostly off-screen, on Desperate Housewives, opposite Felicity Huffman, Marcia Cross, Eva Longoria and Teri Hatcher during the show's run from 2004 to 2012. She played the deceased Mary Alice Young, who narrates the events of her friends' and neighbors' lives from beyond the grave. Her narrations yielded an Emmy Award nomination for Outstanding Voice-Over Performance in 2011 and 2012. Along with the cast, she received two Screen Actors Guild Award for Outstanding Performance by an Ensemble in a Comedy Series in 2005 and 2006. Strong's character narrated all but two episodes of the series. One of the two exceptions is the season 3 episode narrated by Steven Culp, after his character, Rex Van de Kamp, is killed by George Williams and he observes the lives of the men on the street. The other episode is during season 5 and is narrated by Nicollette Sheridan, in which her character, Edie Britt, dies of a car crash, followed by electrocution.

Strong has appeared several times in flashbacks and in a dream episode in which Lynette struggles to understand why she could not stop Mary Alice's suicide. She played another deceased wife on the television series Everwood, appearing mainly in flashback sequences as the late Julia Brown. Coincidentally, Cross played Dr. Linda Abbott, a love interest for Brown's widower, during the second season of Everwood. Both Strong and Cross appear in season 9 of Seinfeld (episodes 9 and 8 respectively).

In addition to her role on Desperate Housewives, Strong starred as Mary Ann Steed in the movie trilogy The Work and the Glory, based on a bestselling series of the same name by Gerald N. Lund. She starred in the 2006 Lifetime movie Family in Hiding. Also in 2006, she played Ted Danson's love interest in the short-lived ABC comedy series Help Me Help You. She also guest starred on Curb Your Enthusiasm as a love interest of Larry David, Law & Order: Criminal Intent, Boston Legal, and Rizzoli & Isles.

2012–2014: Dallas

During her final year on Desperate Housewives, Strong signed on to play Ann Ewing, the third wife of Bobby Ewing (Patrick Duffy) and new matriarch of Southfork Ranch, in the TNT series Dallas, the revival of long-running CBS prime time soap opera of the same name. Strong previously made a guest appearance in the original series in 1987 as Cliff's one night stand. The show premiered on June 13, 2012, and was cancelled after three seasons in 2014. During her Dallas years, she began hosting Investigation Discovery series Blood Relatives and played Joan Reston, the wife of Governor Samuel Reston, in the two episodes of Shonda Rhimes' political series Scandal.

2015–present
After Dallas, Strong appeared in an episode of NBC comedy procedural The Mysteries of Laura. In 2015, she joined the cast of the third season of The CW post-apocalyptic drama series The 100, playing the role of Nia, Queen of the Ice Nation. In 2016, Strong had a recurring role on season 2 of Fear the Walking Dead. Later she joined the cast of The CW series Supergirl a recurring role as Lillian Luthor.

In 2018, Strong appeared in the second season of Netflix series 13 Reasons Why. In 2018, Strong was promoted to series regular status for its third season.

Personal life
A certified yoga instructor and fertility expert, Strong has taught at UCLA's Mind/Body Institute.

Strong married Tom Henri in July 1989; they have a child, Zakery Henri. She filed for divorce on January 14, 2011. In May 2015, she married director-actor John Farmanesh-Bocca.

In 2019, the actress won the Best First Time Filmmaker Award at the GI Film Festival San Diego for her directorial debut #3 Normandy Lane.

Filmography

Film

Television

References

External links

 
 

20th-century American actresses
21st-century American actresses
American soap opera actresses
American film actresses
American television actresses
Actresses from Portland, Oregon
American yoga teachers
Miss America 1980s delegates
Arizona State University alumni
People from Clackamas County, Oregon
Sandy High School alumni
1960 births
Living people
Educators from Oregon
American women educators
American beauty pageant winners